Erin Marie Greening (born June 20, 1997) is an American soccer player who plays as a defender for Glasgow City of the Scottish Women's Premier League.

Early life 
Greening played with local club side Bay Oaks Botafogo in Oakland, winning back-to-back CYSA State Championships in 2012 and 2013. She lettered four years at Piedmont High School and was named All-League for all four seasons on the way to becoming the school's all-time leading scorer.

Colorado Buffaloes 
Greening attended the University of Colorado Boulder from 2015 to 2018 where she got a degree in strategic communication and was a three time Pac-12 All-Academic honorable mention. She was a multi-positional player during her collegiate career, playing midfield and forward in her first two years before transitioning to full-back. In her junior year, she was part of a defensive line that kept a school-record 14 shutouts.

Professional career

Orlando Pride 
Greening was selected in the third round (25th overall) of the 2019 NWSL College Draft by Orlando Pride. Following preseason, she was officially signed to the team's senior roster on April 10. She made her professional debut on April 14 as a substitute in the team's season opener at home to Portland Thorns. She scored her first professional goal on July 14, 2019, a 90th-minute equalizer against the same opposition. Portland would go on to win 4–3 in stoppage time. On August 5, 2020, Greening was waived.

Klepp IL 
On January 25, 2021, Greening signed for Norwegian Toppserien team Klepp IL. In April 2021, Klepp general manager Thomas Langholm Enger confirmed Greening was one of four foreign recruits signed by the club still waiting for permission from the Norwegian government to enter the country due to the ongoing COVID-19 pandemic. After being named as an unused substitute twice, Greening made her Klepp debut on June 26 as a 64th-minute substitute in a 7–0 defeat to defending champions Vålerenga and made her first start four days later as Klepp lost 2–1 to Rosenborg. Greening missed the next fourteen weeks with a tibial fracture. In total, she appeared in nine league games with six starts as Klepp finished bottom and were relegated to the 1. divisjon.

Glasgow City 
On August 1, 2022, Greening signed for Glasgow City of the Scottish Women's Premier League.

Career statistics

Club
.

References

External links 
 Colorado bio
 

1997 births
Living people
American women's soccer players
American expatriate sportspeople in Scotland
Expatriate women's footballers in Scotland
Glasgow City F.C. players
Scottish Women's Premier League players
American expatriate sportspeople in Norway
Expatriate women's footballers in Norway
Klepp IL players
Toppserien players
Colorado Buffaloes women's soccer players
Orlando Pride draft picks
Orlando Pride players
National Women's Soccer League players
Soccer players from California
People from Piedmont, California
Women's association football defenders